Grist is grain that has been separated from its chaff in preparation for grinding. It can also mean grain that has been ground at a gristmill. Its etymology derives from the verb grind.

Grist can be ground into meal or flour, depending on how coarsely it is ground. Maize made into grist is called grits when it is coarse, and corn meal when it is finely ground. Wheat, oats, barley, and buckwheat are also ground and sifted into flour and farina. Grist is also used in brewing and distillation to make a mash.

"Grist for the mill" 

The proverb "all is grist for the mill" means "everything can be made useful, or be a source of profit." There are some minor variations, such as "all's grist that comes to his mill", meaning that the person in question can make something positive out of anything that comes along.

A miller ground whatever grain was brought to him, and charged a portion of the final product for the service. Therefore, all grain arriving at the mill represented income, regardless of its quality. The first recorded usage was in the 16th century, but the term is probably much older. The term "gristmill" was once common in the United States and Britain to describe a small mill open to all comers.

References
Quinion Michael (4 July 1996). The Miller's Tale. via World Wide Words.

Cereals